Yaque may refer to:
Yaque or Cují Yaque, an emblematic tree in Venezuela
Yaque del Norte River,  the longest river in the Dominican Republic
Yaque del Sur River, a river in the southwestern Dominican Republic
Playa El Yaque, a beach in the southern side of Margarita Island, Venezuela
Hato del Yaque, a municipal district in the province of Santiago, Dominican Republic